Lafut-e Bala (also Romanized as Lafūt-e Bālā; also known as Lafūt) is a village in Kurka Rural District, in the Central District of Astaneh-ye Ashrafiyeh County, Gilan Province, Iran. At the 2006 census, its population was 357, in 108 families.

References 

Populated places in Astaneh-ye Ashrafiyeh County